Rădeni may refer to:

In Moldova:
 Rădeni, Călăraşi, a commune in Călăraşi district
 Rădeni, Străşeni, a commune in Străşeni district

In Romania:
 Rădeni, a village in Frumuşica Commune, Botoşani County
 Rădeni, a village in Roşcani Commune, Iaşi County
 Rădeni, a village in Păstrăveni Commune, Neamţ County
 Rădeni, a village in Dragomireşti Commune, Vaslui County

See also 
 Radu (given name)
 Radu (surname)
 Rădulescu (surname)
 Răducan (surname)
 Răducanu (surname)
 Rădești (disambiguation)
 Răduțești (disambiguation)
 Rădulești (disambiguation)